John Henry Bayne (1804–1870) was a Maryland politician and doctor who served in the state House of Delegates and state senate. Despite being a slaveholder and defender of chattel slavery, Bayne served as a surgeon and brevet colonel in the Union Army during the Civil War. By 1864, he viewed it impossible to maintain slavery and the Union, and he encouraged Maryland to abolish slavery in its new constitution.

Bayne was owner of the Salubria plantation near Oxon Hill, Prince George's County, Maryland. He was elected as a Whig to represent Prince George's in the House of Delegates' 1841 session. A year later, he became a justice of the peace. From December 1861 to 1864, he represented Prince George's in the state senate as a Unionist. Both as a delegate and as a private citizen, Bayne was a strong advocate for slaveholders and in particular advocated for government action to prevent enslaved people from escaping bondage.

Bayne was also a noted horticulturist, writing extensively about the cultivation of strawberries and tomatoes, among other fruits. He reportedly had more than 15,000 fruit trees on his farm. In 1847, The Baltimore Sun referred to Bayne as "that prince of horticulturists." He assisted in the planning for the Maryland Agricultural College, the precursor to the University of Maryland, College Park.

References

1804 births
1870 deaths
People from Prince George's County, Maryland
American horticulturists
American slave owners
19th-century American politicians
Maryland Whigs
Maryland state senators
Members of the Maryland House of Delegates